Ejdabrine, Ejd Aabrine, (/'iijdebrin/), is a Sunni Muslim and Maronite Christian community in the Koura District of Lebanon. Both religions coexist peacefully. It is beautiful and lush, and the jaouz river (/nahr-el-jaouz/) surrounds it.

History of the village's name is unknown, but some say it refers to the unique trees that branch over the river.

Etymology 
The root of the name is yet hindered unknown, so the only reasonable analysis of the village's etymology, for now, would be the dissection of the name. Although, it is possible that the name of the village comes from the unique trees near the jaouz river.  

Equidistantly, the village shares similarity in name with two other villages not geographically far from it. Abrine and Ijdabra are the two villages, both of which are located in the Batroun District. Since all three names are a transliteration from Arabic, the connection is closer than is made out to be. 

Abrine, Ijdabra, and Ejdabrine. ِ"Abr"  means across. "Ijd" or "Ejd"  means [go] find. The "ine" is a common Arabic tool used to make a word refer to two in which "Abrine" would mean "two paths". So Ejdabrine in whole would literally mean, "[go] find two paths". If the meaning of the name truly is this, geographically speaking, one logical explanation would go back to the jaouz river trees in which the name is in reference to that. Another possibility of the name is the literal entrance to the village, which, in turn, is hard to explain how it might reference to the name, and that might be a reason why the name may not actually refer to the village's entrance. 

Of course, the translation is not limited to that as "Ejd" could mean a variety of things. Several of those meanings could be "renewed", "grandfather", "[I] found", and, in Arabic, the word is a variation of "prowess" or "strength". Same with "Abr" in which the word could also mean a variety of things. 

Another possibility is that this name comes from another language or is a mix of Arabic with a different language. The different languages could vary from Phoenician (Greek), French, Spanish, and Aramaic. 

All of this is speculation and the only possible analysis until a reference is taken hold of; the village is a place of simple-times where people go to farm and spend time with family and members of the community.

Geography

Abrine & Ijdabra 
Ejdabrine being at Southernmost of the Koura District, the villages, Abrine and Ijdabra, are located in the Batroun District. Abrine is about 26 km Southwest of Ejdabrine, and Ijdabra is right below Abrine, the two separated only by the Batroun-Tannourine Road and the Cross of Hope in between the two villages, leaning more into Ijdabra.

The Jaouz River 
Geographically tucked below the rise of the mountain in this area, this river is not central to the village and it can rarely be seen, save at the site itself. That being said, the jaouz river is not solely for Ejdabrine. 1,000m above sea level and 38 km long, the river starts along from Tannourine El-Tahta in the Batroun District, passes through Boustane El-Assi, then Ras Nhach, goes further North into the Koura District along South of Ejdabrine, and meets the Mediterranean Sea in Western Batroun, near Seaside Road.

References

External links
Ijdaabrine, Localiban

Populated places in the North Governorate
Koura District
Sunni Muslim communities in Lebanon
Maronite Christian communities in Lebanon